Shouheng Sun is a Chinese-American chemist. He is currently Vernon K. Krieble Professor of Chemistry and Professor of Engineering at Brown University. Sun's research areas include nanochemistry and materials chemistry.

Sun attended Sichuan University in Chengdu, graduating with a Bachelor of Science in chemistry in 1984. He completed a Master of Science in chemistry at Nanjing University. Sun completed his doctorate in chemistry at Brown University in 1996. Sun has taught at Brown since 2005, having previously worked at the Thomas J. Watson Research Center. Sun was named the Vernon K. Krieble Professor of Chemistry in 2016.

References

External links 

 

21st-century American chemists
American academics of Chinese descent
Sichuan University alumni
Nanjing University alumni
Brown University alumni
Brown University faculty
Year of birth missing (living people)
Living people